Jamp'aturi (Aymara jamp'atu frog, -ri or -iri a suffix, also spelled Jampaturi, Jamphaturi) is a  mountain in the Cordillera Real in the Andes of Bolivia. It is located in the La Paz Department, Pedro Domingo Murillo Province, La Paz Municipality, north-east of the city of La Paz. The mountains Mik'aya and Wak'ani are situated south-east of Jamp'aturi. The river Unduavi originates north-west of the mountain.

Jamp'aturi lies near the La Cumbre pass which connects La Paz and the Yungas.

See also
 Ch'uñawi
 Inkachaka Dam
 Sirk'i Quta

References 

Mountains of La Paz Department (Bolivia)